The history of Estonia from 1920 to 1939 spanned the interwar period from the end of the Estonian War of Independence until the outbreak of World War II. It covers the years of parliamentary democracy, the Great Depression and the period of authoritarian rule.

Parliamentary democracy 
Estonia won the Estonian War of Independence against both Soviet Russia and the German Freikorps and Baltische Landeswehr volunteers. Independence was secured with the Tartu Peace Treaty, signed on 2 February 1920.

The first Estonian constitution was adopted by the Constituent Assembly on 15 April 1920. Established as a parliamentary democracy, legislative power was held by a 100-seat parliament or Riigikogu. Executive power was held by a government headed by a State Elder, similar to a prime minister, and both answerable to the parliament.

The Republic of Estonia was recognised (de jure) by Finland on 7 July 1920, Poland on 31 December 1920, Argentina on 12 January 1921, by the Western Allies on 26 January 1921 and by India on 22 September 1921. In 1921, Estonia became a full member of the League of Nations and developed successful economic relations with many countries, including the Soviet Union. The backbone of the Estonian economy became agricultural exports to the West, due to tens of thousands of small farm holdings being established as a result of land reforms that ended the Baltic German economic dominance. A new currency, the Estonian kroon, was introduced in 1928.

Estonian politics during the 1920s was dominated by unstable coalition governments, with a government lasting on average a period of 11 months. This was due to the large number of political parties holding seats in the Riigikogu, which often resulted in discord on specific issues. The 1920s also saw the development of national culture, with emphasis on Estonian language, history, education and ethnography. National minorities were granted cultural autonomy. Communism persisted as a threat to stability in the early 1920s but receded after a failed December 1924 Estonian coup d'état attempt. A volunteer Estonian Defence League as subsequently established. However efforts to establish a Baltic League comprising the Baltic states, Finland and Poland, failed to materialise.

The Great Depression 
Estonia's export oriented economy was severely affected by the Great Depression, with industry and agriculture declining 20 to 45% respectively. As a consequence incomes declined, unemployment rose and the standard of living declined. This led to political turmoil and a further fragmentation of parliament, with the government changing six times in the two years before 1933. Calls for changing the constitution, reducing the powers of the parliament and establishing a presidency with extended powers found a receptive audience. The Vaps movement grew in popularity and influence and a new constitution drafted by the movement was passed by a referendum in October 1933.

Period of authoritarian centrist rule 

1934 saw an easing of the consequences of the depression, with the devaluation of the kroon and improved terms of trade. The passing of the second constitution in 1933 and the planned elections for a new president eased political tensions. With the prospect of Vaps movement achieving electoral victory, Konstantin Päts and Johan Laidoner conducted a military coup d’état on 12 March 1934, arresting hundreds of Vaps members. A six-month state of emergency was declared, postponing the elections and political meetings were banned.

During the interwar period Estonia had pursued a policy of neutrality, but the fate of Estonia in World War II was decided by the German–Soviet Nonaggression Pact and its Secret Additional Protocol of August 1939. In the agreement, the two great powers agreed to divide up the countries situated between them (Poland, Lithuania, Latvia, Estonia, and Finland) with Estonia falling in the Soviet "sphere of influence". After the invasion of Poland, the Orzeł incident took place when Polish submarine ORP Orzeł looked for shelter in Tallinn but escaped after the Soviet Union attacked Poland on 17 September 1939. Estonia's lack of will and/or inability to disarm and intern the crew caused the Soviet Union to accuse Estonia of "helping them escape" and claim that Estonia was not neutral. On 24 September 1939, the Soviet Union threatened Estonia with war unless allowed to establish military bases in the country — an ultimatum with which the Estonian government complied.

Downfall 
In 1939, the Soviet Union forced a mutual assistance treaty on Estonia, establishing Soviet military bases and ultimately leading to occupation of the country in 1940.

References 

Estonia